Ian David Battye (birth registered third ¼ 1952 – 28 February 2007), also known by the nickname of "Big Joe",  was an English professional rugby league footballer who played in the 1970s. He played at club level for Kippax Welfare ARLFC and Castleford (Heritage № 586).

Background
Ian Battye's birth was registered in Barkston Ash district, West Riding of Yorkshire, England, and he died aged 54 from throat cancer (Oropharyngeal cancer).

Genealogical information
Ian Battye was married to Mavis, was the father of Michael Battye, and Richard Battye, and the younger brother of Brian H. Battye (birth registered during first ¼  in Barkston Ash district).

References

External links
Search for "Battye" at rugbyleagueproject.org
"Big Joe" Battye
Ian David Battye : Memorial
Photograph "Ian Battye"
Battye Memory Box Search at archive.castigersheritage.com

1952 births
2007 deaths
Castleford Tigers players
Deaths from cancer in England
Deaths from oropharyngeal cancer 
English rugby league players
People from Selby
Rugby league players from Yorkshire